Alberto Gatmaitan Romulo (born August 7, 1933) is a Filipino politician and diplomat. He served in the Philippine in various capacities as Executive Secretary, Finance Secretary, Foreign Affairs Secretary, and Budget Secretary. His most recent office is his leadership of the Department of Foreign Affairs before and during the early period of the administration of President Benigno Aquino III.

Romulo was born in Camiling, Tarlac from Pangasinan and Tagalog parents. He was then elected as member of the Regular Batasang Pambansa representing Quezon City in 1984. He then joined government service as the interim Minister of the Budget of President Corazon Aquino during the transition period following the 1986 EDSA People Power Revolution. He was a senator from 1987 to 1998, during which time he served as Majority Leader for five years. As Majority Leader, he greatly helped then Senate President Neptali Gonzales, Sr. in running the plenary sessions of the Senate and in executing its legislative mill. In November 1989, Romulo avoided a fatal helicopter crash near Maulong, Catbalogan when an Army commander convinced him to ride another helicopter going to Catbalogan.

He became Finance Secretary in January 2001, having been appointed when President Gloria Macapagal Arroyo took office and formed her own cabinet. He left this position in May 2001; Romulo was later appointed as an Executive Secretary. On August 18, 2004, he was appointed Foreign Secretary, and which he would hold until February 25, 2011, under President Aquino. He served as Chairman of the Association of Southeast Asian Nations or ASEAN in 2007.

In March 2017, Romulo was appointed chairman and director of the board of the Development Bank of the Philippines.

References

1933 births
Living people
Secretaries of Foreign Affairs of the Philippines
De La Salle University alumni
People from Pangasinan
People from Tarlac
Executive Secretaries of the Philippines
Secretaries of Finance of the Philippines
Senators of the 8th Congress of the Philippines
Senators of the 9th Congress of the Philippines
Senators of the 10th Congress of the Philippines
Majority leaders of the Senate of the Philippines
Secretaries of Budget and Management of the Philippines
Members of the House of Representatives of the Philippines from Quezon City
Manuel L. Quezon University alumni
Laban ng Demokratikong Pilipino politicians
Benigno Aquino III administration cabinet members
Arroyo administration cabinet members
Corazon Aquino administration cabinet members
Members of the Batasang Pambansa
Heads of government-owned and controlled corporations of the Philippines
Duterte administration personnel
Grand Crosses of the Order of Lakandula